Zhang Yan ( 180s–205), born Chu Yan, also known as Zhang Feiyan, was the leader of the Heishan bandits during the late Eastern Han dynasty of China. He rose from a local rebel to master of a confederation that could hold off the Han and was able to maintain authority in Changshan until he chose to surrender to Cao Cao, getting enfeoffment that remained with his family.

Life
Chu Yan was from Zhending County, Changshan Commandery, which is around present-day Zhengding County, Hebei. Because he was fast, agile, and brave, his men called him "Feiyan", meaning "Flying Swallow". He raised forces during the Yellow Turban revolt and pillaged Shanze then aligned with the bandit forces of Zhang Niujue  with Niujue as the superior commander. When the group raided Julu Commandery in 185 and attacked Yingtao, Zhang Niujue was mortally wounded by an arrow. Before he died, Zhang ordered his men to obey Chu Yan as their new leader. Chu Yan thus changed his family name from "Chu" to "Zhang" to honour Zhang Niujue.

Zhang Yan's confederation steadily grew in strength, until they were said to be one million strong. They became known as the Heishan bandits, and operated as a bandit confederacy in the Taihang Mountains which gave them access to Henei and the provinces of Bing, Ji, and Yan. All the commanderies north of the Yellow River were exposed to their attacks and while Lu Zhi was able to drive Zhang Yan forces away from the capital region of Henei, the Han could not suppress the rebellion. In order to pacify him, the government eventually appointed Zhang Yan "General of the Household Who Pacifies Disorder" and granted him the right to appoint officials in his territories, bringing the group within the administration.

By the early 190s with the land in civil war, Zhang Yan had formed an alliance with the warlord Gongsun Zan against their common opponent, Yuan Shao. In 193, the Heishan bandits had backed mutineers and local rivals of Yuan Shao to seize his capital of Ye and nearly captured Yuan Shao's family. Yuan Shao responded with force, allying with reinforcements from some of the Wuhuan and Xiuchuge tribes with the support of Lü Bu, marching 250 kilometers (over 150 miles) through the Taihang Mountains, destroying the Heishan bandit camps as he went. The southern hills were overrun, but at Changshan, Zhang Yan had 20-30 thousand soldiers and several thousand cavalry, he fought for over ten days with Yuan Shao, Zhang Yan suffered major casualties and suffered the worst of the fighting but Yuan Shao's troops were exhausted and also withdrew. In 199, Zhang Yan responded to Gongsun Zan's request, via son Gongsun Xu, for help by marching along three routes in the Battle of Yijing against Yuan Shao, but Gongsun Zan was defeated and killed before Zhang Yan arrived.

In 204, Zhang Yan made contact with the warlord Cao Cao, who at the time was warring against Yuan Shao's sons, Yuan Tan and Yuan Shang and besieging Ye. Cao Cao appointed him General Who Pacifies The North. In the summer of 205, after Cao Cao drove the Yuan's to the Wuhuan, Zhang Yan brought his 100,000 followers and surrendered, he was enfeoffed as the Marquis of Anguo Village. After his death, his son Zhang Fang succeeded him as marquis; his family maintained their fief during the following decades.

See also
 Lists of people of the Three Kingdoms

References

Works cited

Further reading 
 Chen, Shou (3rd century). Records of the Three Kingdoms (Sanguozhi).
 
 Pei, Songzhi (5th century). Annotations to Records of the Three Kingdoms (Sanguozhi zhu).
 Sima, Guang (1084). Zizhi Tongjian.

Gongsun Zan and associates
People from Shijiazhuang
Generals under Cao Cao
Han dynasty generals from Hebei
2nd-century births
Year of death unknown